Shmakov is a Russian masculine surname, its feminine counterpart is Shmakova. It may refer to
Igor Shmakov (1985–2011), Russian actor
Vladimir Shmakov, Uzbekistani judoka
Yevhen Shmakov (born 1985), Ukrainian football midfielder 

Russian-language surnames